Bryan High School is a public high school in Bryan, Ohio. It is the only high school in the Bryan City School District and serves students in grades 9 through 12. Athletic teams are known as the Golden Bears. They are members of the Northwest Ohio Athletic League and are the largest school participating in the league. As of the 2021–22 school year, enrollment is 546 students.

Athletics

State championships
 Baseball – 1975 
 Boys cross country – 1995 
 Girls bowling – 2020

Notable alumni
 Chris Carpenter, professional baseball player in Major League Baseball
 Steve Fireovid, professional baseball player in Major League Baseball
 Matt Wisler, professional baseball player in Major League Baseball

References

External links
 

High schools in Williams County, Ohio
Public high schools in Ohio
High School